Walter Croston "Walt" Young (March 2, 1922 – August 6, 2016) was an American educator and politician.

Background
Born in Rochester, New York, Young served in the United States Army Air Corps, in the Pacific, during World War II. He then received a B.S. degree from Niagara University, 1949; an M.S. degree from Barry University, 1957; an Ed.D. degree from the University of Miami, 1965. Young was elected to the Pembroke Pines City Council in 1962 and served on the Broward Community College Board of Trustees, 1971–1976. In 1972, Young was elected to the Florida House of Representatives as a Democrat. He served ten consecutive terms until his retirement in 1992. Upon retirement from the Florida House, he was appointed to the Florida Department of Elder Affairs State Advisory Board. Young died on August 6, 2016, at the age of 94.

Legacy
Because of his service to the city of Pembroke Pines, the community named its middle school after him; Walter C. Young Middle School and Resource Center opened its doors in early 1991.

References 

1922 births
2016 deaths
Florida city council members
Democratic Party members of the Florida House of Representatives
People from Pembroke Pines, Florida
Politicians from Rochester, New York
Military personnel from Rochester, New York
United States Army Air Forces soldiers
Barry University alumni
Niagara University alumni
University of Miami School of Education alumni
Businesspeople from Florida
United States Army Air Forces personnel of World War II
20th-century American businesspeople